Khalifeh Hesar (also Romanized as Khalīfeh Ḩeşār; also known as Khalīfeh Ḩeşār va Mīlān (Persian: خليفه حصار و ميلان), Khalīfeh Ḩeşār-e Mīlān, Khalfasar, and Khalf-e Sār) is a village in Darsajin Rural District, in the Central District of Abhar County, Zanjan Province, Iran. At the 2006 census,its population was 192, in 51 families.And the language of the people of this village is Old  Persian, which is  Lori Bakhtiari.

Antiquities 
The ancient cemetery of this village called White Hill, which belongs to the Seljuk era, has been registered in the list of national monuments of Iran.

Weather

Gallery

References 

Populated places in Abhar County